Bisque may refer to:
 Biscuit porcelain, unglazed porcelain as a finished product
 Bisque (pottery), a piece of partially fired, or "biscuit-fired" unglazed pottery
 Bisque doll, a doll made of bisque or biscuit porcelain
 Bisque (food), a thick, creamy soup made from puréed seafood or vegetables
 Bisque, a free turn in a handicap croquet match
 Bisque, a free point in a handicap real tennis match
 Bisque, when a number of unpaired MPs in the United Kingdom may be allowed to be absent—at specified times on a rota basis—from votes in the Houses of Parliament.
 BisQue (Bioimage Analysis and Management Platform), a computer platform for the exchange and exploration of large, complex images and datasets
 bisque, a web color